Anja Štefan (Rijeka, 3 August 1988) is a Croatian snowboarder. Most recently she won the silver medal in the Slopestyle at the 2010–11 FIS Snowboard World Cup.

External links 
FIS profile
CROski profile

1988 births
Living people
Croatian female snowboarders
Sportspeople from Rijeka